The keffiyeh or kufiyya, also known in Arabic as a ghutrah, shemagh,  is a traditional headdress traditionally worn by men in parts of the Middle East.

It is fashioned from a square scarf, and is usually made of cotton. The keffiyeh is commonly found in arid regions, as it provides protection from sunburn, dust and sand. An agal is often used by Arabs to keep it in place.

Varieties and variations 
As well as Arabs, Kurds and Yazidis also wear this headpiece. Iraqi Turkmen also wear the headpiece, and call it Jamadani.

During his sojourn with the Marsh Arabs of Iraq, Gavin Young noted that the local sayyids—"venerated men accepted [...] as descendants of the Prophet Muhammad and Ali ibn Abi Talib"—wore dark green keffiyeh (cheffiyeh) in contrast to the black-and-white checkered examples typical of the area's inhabitants.

In Indonesia, some of the people used the keffiyeh to show their solidarity with the Palestinians. 

In Turkey, it was forbidden to wear a keffiyeh because it was seen as evidence of support of the PKK.

Palestinian national symbol 

Traditionally worn by Palestinian farmers, the keffiyeh became worn by Palestinian men of any rank and became a symbol of Palestinian nationalism during the Arab Revolt of the 1930s. Its prominence increased during the 1960s with the beginning of the Palestinian resistance movement and its adoption by Palestinian leader Yasser Arafat.

The black-and-white fishnet pattern keffiyeh would later become Arafat's iconic symbol, and he would rarely be seen without it; only occasionally would he wear a military cap, or, in colder climates, a Russian-style ushanka hat. Arafat would wear his keffiyeh in a semi-traditional way, wrapped around his head via an agal. He also wore a similarly patterned piece of cloth in the neckline of his military fatigues. Early on, he had made it his personal trademark to drape the scarf over his right shoulder only, arranging it in the rough shape of a triangle, to resemble the outlines of historic Palestine. This way of wearing the keffiyeh became a symbol of Arafat as a person and political leader, and it has not been imitated by other Palestinian leaders.

Another Palestinian figure associated with the keffiyeh is Leila Khaled, a female member of the armed wing of the Popular Front for the Liberation of Palestine. Several photographs of Khaled circulated in the Western newspapers after the hijacking of TWA Flight 840 and the Dawson's Field hijackings. These photos often included Khaled wearing a keffiyeh in the style of a Muslim woman's hijab, wrapped around the head and shoulders. This was unusual, as the keffiyeh is associated with Arab masculinity, and many believe this to be something of a fashion statement by Khaled, denoting her equality with men in the Palestinian armed struggle.

The colors of the stitching in a keffiyeh are also vaguely associated with Palestinians' political sympathies. Traditional black and white keffiyehs became associated with Fatah. Later, red and white keffiyehs were adopted by Palestinian Marxists, such as the PFLP.

Symbol of Palestinian solidarity 
The black and white chequered keffiyeh has become a symbol of Palestinian nationalism, dating back to the 1936–1939 Arab revolt in Palestine. Outside of the Middle East and North Africa, the keffiyeh first gained popularity among activists supporting the Palestinians in the conflict with Israel.

The wearing of the keffiyeh often comes with criticism from various political factions in the ongoing Israeli–Palestinian conflict. The slang "keffiyeh kinderlach" refers to young Jews, particularly college students, who sport a keffiyeh around the neck as a political/fashion statement. This term may have first appeared in print in an article by Bradley Burston in which he writes of "the suburban-exile keffiyeh kinderlach of Berkeley, more Palestinian by far than the Palestinians" in their criticism of Israel. European activists have also worn the keffiyeh.

Production 

Today, this symbol of Palestinian identity is now largely imported from China. With the scarf's growing popularity in the 2000s, Chinese manufacturers entered the market, driving Palestinians out of the business. In 2008, Yasser Hirbawi, who for five decades had been the only Palestinian manufacturer of keffiyehs, was struggling with sales.

Mother Jones wrote, "Ironically, global support for Palestinian-statehood-as-fashion-accessory has put yet another nail in the coffin of the Occupied Territories' beleaguered economy."

Westerners in keffiyeh 

British Colonel T. E. Lawrence (better known as Lawrence of Arabia) was probably the best-known Western wearer of the keffiyeh and agal during his involvement in the Arab Revolt in World War I. This image of Lawrence was later popularized by the film epic about him, Lawrence of Arabia, in which he was played by Peter O'Toole.

The 1920s silent-film era of American cinema saw studios take to Orientalist themes of the exotic Middle East, possibly due to the view of Arabs as part of the Allies of World War I, and keffiyehs became a standard part of the theatrical wardrobe. These films and their male leads typically had Western actors in the role of an Arab, often wearing the keffiyeh with the agal (as with The Sheik and The Son of the Sheik, starring actor Rudolph Valentino).

Fashion trend 
As with other articles of clothing worn in wartime, such as the T-shirt, fatigues and khaki pants, the keffiyeh has been seen as chic among non-Arabs in the West. Keffiyehs became popular in the United States in the late 1980s, at the start of the First Intifada, when bohemian girls and punks wore keffiyehs as scarves around their necks. In the early 2000s, keffiyehs were very popular among youths in Tokyo, who often wore them with camouflage clothing. The trend recurred in the mid-2000s in the United States, Europe, Canada and Australia, when the keffiyeh became popular as a fashion accessory, usually worn as a scarf around the neck in hipster circles. Stores such as Urban Outfitters and TopShop stocked the item (however, after some controversy over the retailer's decision to label the item "anti-war scarves" Urban Outfitters pulled it). In spring 2008, keffiyehs in colors like purple and mauve were given away in issues of fashion magazines in Spain and France. In the UAE, males are inclining towards more Western headgear while the women are developing preferences for dupatta—the traditional head cover of South Asia. The appropriation of the keffiyeh as a fashion statement by non-Arab wearers separate from its political and historical meaning has been the subject of controversy in recent years. While it is worn often as a symbol of solidarity with the Palestinian struggle, the fashion industry has disregarded its significance by using its pattern and style in day-to-day clothing design. For example, in 2016 Topshop released a romper with the Keffiyeh print, calling it a "scarf playsuit". This led to accusations of cultural appropriation and Topshop eventually pulled the item from their website. The Gulf style keffiyeh became popular during the 2022 FIFA World Cup, which was held in Qatar, with many variations featuring participating team colors selling out quickly.

See also

References

Further reading 
  The lexicon includes more references explaining what a sudra is on page 962.

External links 

 "The Keffiyeh and the Arab Heartland" from About.com
 "Saudi Aramco World: The dye that binds" by Caroline Stone
 More references about a sudra on page 962 from Jastrow Dictionary Online
 Modern Chronology of the Keffiyah Kraze from Arab American blog Kabobfest
 Che Couture Gives way to Kurds' Puşi Chic by Işıl Eğrikavuk, Hurriyet
 Palestinian Keffiyeh outgrows Mideast conflict
 Last factory in Palestine produces Kuffiyeh
 Hirbawi: The Only Original Kufiya Made in Palestine 

Arab culture
Arabic clothing
Clothing in politics
Headgear
History of Asian clothing
Islamic male clothing
Middle Eastern clothing
Palestinian nationalism
Palestinian clothing
Scarves